Anugraha (Kannada: ಅನುಗ್ರಹ) is a 1971 Indian Kannada film, directed by H. L. N. Simha and produced by K. M. Somasundarappa. The film stars K. S. Ashwath, Srinath, Narasimharaju and T. N. Balakrishna in the lead roles. The film has musical score by Rajan–Nagendra.

Cast

K. S. Ashwath as Mallanna
Srinath as Mahadeva
Narasimharaju as Chennaiah
T. N. Balakrishna as Doddaiah
Dikki Madhava Rao
Rathnakar
Pandari Bai as Parvati
B. V. Radha
Aarathi as Gowri
Ramadevi
Nagappa
Eshwarappa
Rajanand
Sorat Nagaraj
H. T. Urs
Nandakumar
Seetharam
Shivalingu
Rama
Lakshmidevi
Vasanthi
Nirmala
Kuppu Swamy
Master Shivashankar

References

External links
 
 

1971 films
1970s Kannada-language films
Films scored by Rajan–Nagendra
Films directed by H. L. N. Simha